Munich West/Centre is an electoral constituency (German: Wahlkreis) represented in the Bundestag. It elects one member via first-past-the-post voting. Under the current constituency numbering system, it is designated as constituency 220. It is located in southern Bavaria, comprising the western and central part of the city of Munich.

Munich West/Centre was created for the inaugural 1949 federal election. Since 2017, it has been represented by Stephan Pilsinger of the Christian Social Union (CSU).

Geography
Munich West/Centre is located in southern Bavaria. As of the 2021 federal election, it comprises the boroughs of Ludwigsvorstadt-Isarvorstadt (2), Schwanthalerhöhe (8), Neuhausen-Nymphenburg (9), Pasing-Obermenzing (21), Aubing-Lochhausen-Langwied (22), Allach-Untermenzing (23), and Laim (25) from the independent city of Munich.

History
Munich West/Centre was created in 1949, then known as München-West. It acquired its current name in the 2002 election. In the 1949 election, it was Bavaria constituency 8 in the numbering system. In the 1953 through 1961 elections, it was number 203. In the 1965 through 1976 elections, it was number 208. In the 1980 through 1998 elections, it was number 207. In the 2002 and 2005 elections, it was number 222. In the 2009 and 2013 elections, it was number 221. Since the 2017 election, it has been number 220.

Originally, the constituency comprised the boroughs of Allach, Aubing, Laim, Langwied, Lochhausen, Neuhausen, Nymphenburg, Obermenzing, Pasing, Schwanthalerhöhe, and Untermenzing. In the 1965 election, it lost the borough of Neuhausen. It acquired its current borders in the 2002 election.

Members
The constituency was first represented by Otto Graf of the Social Democratic Party (SPD) from 1949 to 1953. Benno Graf of the Christian Social Union (CSU) was elected in 1953 and served one term. Anton Besold of the CSU then served from 1957 to 1965. Erwin Folger of the SPD won the constituency in 1965 and served until 1972. He was succeeded by fellow SPD member Manfred Marschall from 1972 to 1976. Peter Schmidhuber won the constituency for the CSU in 1976 and served one term. He was succeeded by fellow CSU member Kurt Faltlhauser, who was representative from 1980 to 1998. Hans-Peter Uhl CSU then served from 1998 to 2017. Stephan Pilsinger of the CSU was elected in 2017 and re-elected in 2021.

Election results

2021 election

2017 election

2013 election

2009 election

References

Federal electoral districts in Bavaria
1949 establishments in West Germany
Constituencies established in 1949
Munich